The 2017–18 season is Scunthorpe United's 119th season in their existence and their fourth consecutive season in League One. Along with competing in League One, the club will also participate in the FA Cup, EFL Cup and EFL Trophy. The season covers the period from 1 July 2017 to 30 June 2018.

Squad

Statistics

|-
|colspan=14|Player(s) out on loan:

|-
|colspan=14|Player(s) who left the club during the season:

|}

Goals record

Disciplinary Record

Competitions

Friendlies
As of 26 June 2017, Scunthorpe United have announced six pre-season friendlies against York City, Luton Town, North Ferriby United, Sunderland, Austria Salzburg. and SK Strobl.

League One

League table

Result summary

Results by matchday

Matches

League One play-offs

FA Cup
On 16 October 2017, Scunthorpe United were drawn away to Northampton Town in the first round. A 0–0 draw meant a replay would be played at Glanford Park.

EFL Cup
On 16 June 2017, Scunthorpe United were drawn at home to Notts County in the first round. An away trip to Middlesbrough was drawn out for the second round.

EFL Trophy
On 12 July 2017, Scunthorpe were drawn against Doncaster Rovers, Grimsby Town and Sunderland U23s in Northern Group H. After winning the group, Scunthorpe were handed a home tie against Leicester City U21s in the second round.

Transfers

Transfers in

Transfers out

Loans in

Loans out

References

Scunthorpe United
Scunthorpe United F.C. seasons